Said Tamghart is a rugby league footballer who played in the 2000s and 2010s.

Background
He is of French-Algerian extraction.

Playing career
Tamghart has previously played for Carpentras XIII, Avignon Bisons and UTC in the French Elite One Championship.

In 2008 he played for the Oldham R.L.F.C. in National League Two and in 2009 joined Halifax on a two-year contract.

References

External links
Halifax profile
Oldham profile
Bennett on the offensive over citing

1980 births
Living people
Catalans Dragons players
France national rugby league team players
French sportspeople of Algerian descent
French rugby league players
Halifax R.L.F.C. players
Oldham R.L.F.C. players
Place of birth missing (living people)
RC Carpentras XIII players
Rugby league props
Rugby league second-rows
Sporting Olympique Avignon players